Hanayama is a Japanese toy company founded in 1933. They are best known for their metal disassembly puzzles "HUZZLE" series (also known as "CAST PUZZLE"), which include reproductions of older designs, and new puzzles by other inventors such as Oskar van Deventer and Akio Yamamoto.

References

External links
Official Website (Japanese)
Official Website (English)

Toy companies of Japan
1972 establishments in Japan
Design companies established in 1972
Manufacturing companies established in 1972
Puzzle manufacturers